James Daniel Eisenhauer (January 1, 1832 – November 16, 1896) was a merchant and political figure in Nova Scotia, Canada. He represented Lunenburg in the House of Commons of Canada from 1887 to 1891 as a Liberal member.

Early life and education
He was born in Lunenburg, Nova Scotia, the son of German immigrants, and was educated there.

Career
Eisenhauer was a major exporter of fish to the West Indies. He was president of the Lunenburg Marine Association and treasurer for the Nova Scotia Wood Pulp and Paper Company. Eisenhauer represented Lunenburg County in the Nova Scotia House of Assembly from 1867 to 1878; he was defeated when he ran for reelection in 1878. After serving one term in the House of Commons, Eisenhauer was unsuccessful in the 1891 general election.

Personal life
In 1859, he married Mary Ann Begg.

Electoral record

References 

The Canadian parliamentary companion, 1889, JA Gemmill

1832 births
1896 deaths
Canadian people of German descent
Nova Scotia Liberal Party MLAs
Liberal Party of Canada MPs
Members of the House of Commons of Canada from Nova Scotia